Sara Ibrahim Butai is a Jordanian footballer who plays as a midfielder. She has been a member of the Jordan women's national team.

International career
Butai capped for Jordan at senior level during the 2010 AFC Women's Asian Cup qualification.

References 

Living people
Jordanian women's footballers
Women's association football midfielders
Jordan women's international footballers
Year of birth missing (living people)